Felix Strauß (born 26 March 2001) is an Austrian professional footballer who plays as a centre-back for Austrian Football Bundesliga club Rheindorf Altach. He has represented Austria at under-21 level.

Club career

Early years
Strauß began his career at SC Golling. In February 2014, he moved to the youth teams of SV Grödig. Ahead of the 2014–15 season, he joined the renowned academy of Red Bull Salzburg, where he progressed through all age groups in the academy. Before the 2019–20 season, he moved to Germany to join the U19 team of Viktoria Köln. For the Cologne-based club he made 19 appearances in the Under 19 Bundesliga as team captain.

Blau-Weiß Linz
Prior to the 2020–21 season, Strauß returned to Austria to join second division club Blau-Weiß Linz on a contract until June 2022. He made his 2. Liga debut on 11 September 2020, when he came off the bench for Bernhard Janeczek in the 82nd minute on the first matchday of that season against Austria Klagenfurt. By the end of the season, he had made 28 appearances in the second division, scoring two goals.

Rheindorf Altach

2021–22 season
On 21 June 2021, Strauß signed a three-year contract with Austrian Football Bundesliga club Rheindorf Altach. He made his debut on 24 July, the opening day of the domestic league, in a 1–0 home loss to LASK. He would quickly establish himself in the starting lineup of the Vorarlberg-based side, first as a defensive midfielder under head coach Damir Canadi, and, as the season progressed, as a centre-back alongside Jan Zwischenbrugger. 

His performances earned him a call-up to the Austria under-21 team in March 2022, as Altach were involved in a relegation battle. Strauß scored his first goal for the club on 2 April 2022, securing a 2–2 draw and a completed comeback against Admira Wacker Mödling deep into injury time. On 20 May, Strauß scored his second goal for the club which would prove to be crucial as his team managed a 2–1 win over WSG Tirol. Thereby, Altach avoided relegation by finishing one point ahead of Admira Wacker Mödling. In May, Strauß was named as the winner of Rheindorf Altach's Player of the Season award, given to the club's best player from the previous season.

2022–23 season
Strauß missed the first two league games of the 2022–23 season with an infection, and made his first season appearance for Altach on 7 August 2022 in a league game against Austria Wien. He replaced Lukas Gugganig in the 60th minute, before being forced off due to an injury; it was later confirmed how he would be sidelined for several months as he had "torn his ankle ligament". He was set to return to action on 2 October for the league match against SV Ried, and found himself in the starting lineup from then on under new head coach Miroslav Klose.

International career
Strauß received his first call-up to the under-21 squad for European Championship qualifiers against Croatia and Norway in March 2022. He made his debut for Austria U21 when he came on to replace Alexander Prass at half-time of the match against Norway on 29 March.

Career statistics

Honours
Blau-Weiß Linz
 2. Liga: 2020–21

References

External links
 Felix Strauss at SC Rheindorf Altach
 

2001 births
Living people
Austrian footballers
Austria under-21 international footballers
Footballers from Salzburg
Association football defenders
SV Grödig players
FC Red Bull Salzburg players
FC Viktoria Köln players
FC Blau-Weiß Linz players
SC Rheindorf Altach players
Austrian Football Bundesliga players
2. Liga (Austria)